Crassispira tuckerana is a species of sea snail, a marine gastropod mollusk in the family Pseudomelatomidae.

Description
His name Jeff

Distribution
This species is found in the Indian Ocean off  Somalia.

References

 Bonfitto A. & Morassi M. 2004. Crassispira (Crassispirella) tuckeri, new species from Somalia, eastern Africa. The Veliger 47(2) : 157-160
 Bonfitto A. & Morassi M. (2011) Crassispira (Crassispirella) tuckerana, a replacement name for Crassispira (Crassispirella) tuckeri Bonfitto & Morassi, 2004 (Gastropoda: Turridae: Crassispirinae) not Crassispira tuckeri Le Renard, 1994. Zootaxa 2767: 57-58

External links
 

Endemic fauna of Somalia
tuckerana
Gastropods described in 2011